A label is any kind of tag attached to something so as to identify the object or its content. It may refer to:

 Label, an identifier
 Labelling, describing someone or something in a word or short phrase

Physical tags
 Clothing label, referring either to a clothing brand, or to a physical tag on clothing
 Museum label, for exhibitions in museums
 Packaging and labelling, in industry

Arts, entertainment, and media
 Labels, a 1930 travel book by Evelyn Waugh
 "Labels", a song by GZA on the album Liquid Swords
 Labels, a French record label created by Virgin Records, later a division of EMI Music France absorbed now into Warner Music.
 Record label, a brand and a trademark associated with the marketing of music recordings and music videos
 "Labels" (Dexter's Laboratory), an episode of Dexter's Laboratory

Science and technology

Computing
 Label (command), a shell command
 Label (control), a component of user interfaces
 Label (computer science)
 Tape label, human and/or machine readable metadata used by tape storage equipment
 Label, in machine learning, a desired output for a given input in a dataset
 Automatic label placement, computer methods of placing labels automatically on a map or chart
 Labels, the parts of a domain name that are not "dots"
 Revision tag, a textual label associated with a specific revision of a project

Other uses in science and technology
 Isotopic labeling, a technique for tracking the passage of a sample of substance through a system
 Labeling theory, or social reaction theory, a theory in sociology which ascribes labelling of people to control and identification of deviant behavior

Other uses
 Label (heraldry), a charge closely resembling the strap with pendants which, from the saddle, crossed the horse's chest
 Label, an older term for a long thin device, in particular, a ruler as on an astrolabe, circumferentor, or similar instrument
 Label mould or hood mould, architectural moulding above windows to throw-off rainwater
 Labeling (map design), or cartographic labeling, a form of typography that strongly deals with form, style, weight and size of type on a map
 The Label language, an Oceanic language spoken in Papua New Guinea
 Label (philately)

See also
 Black Label (disambiguation)
 Labeling (disambiguation)
 White label